Optatam totius, the Decree on Priestly Training, is a document which was produced by the Second Vatican Council. Approved by a vote of 2,318 to 3 of the bishops assembled at the council, the decree was promulgated by Pope Paul VI on 28 October 1965. The Latin title means "desired renewal of the whole [church]".

Controversy
The period that followed the promulgation Optatam totius was marked by a severe drop in the number of priestly vocations in the Western World. Church leaders had argued that age-old secularization was to blame and that it was not directly related to the documents of the council. Historians have also pointed to the damage caused by the sexual revolution in 1968 and the strong backlash over Humanae vitae. Yet other authors have asserted that the drop in vocations was at least partly deliberate and was part of an attempt to de-clericalize the church and allow for a more pluralistic clergy.

References

1965 documents
1965 in Christianity
Documents of the Second Vatican Council